Mogens Rukov (4 August 1943 – 18 December 2015) was a Danish screenwriter and playwright. He achieved a university degree in Nordic philology and film in 1974. He taught in the screenwriting department at the National Film School of Denmark, Copenhagen.

His efforts to shape new generations of Danish screenwriters were much-respected. He wrote or co-wrote several screenplays and functioned as a consultant on numerous films.

Filmography (selected) 
 The Element of Crime (1984) (consultant: scenario)
 Elise (1985) (writer)
 Space Wreck 1998 (International: English title)
 The Celebration  Dogme #1, 1998 (screenplay)
 The Idiots a.k.a. Dogme #2 (1998) (script consultant)
 The Third Lie (2000) (writer)
 Kira's Reason: A Love Story a.k.a. Dogme #21 (2001) (screenplay in cooperation)
 It's All About Love (2003) (writer)
 Inheritance (2003) (screenplay)
 Reconstruction (writer)
  (2004) (writer)
 The Jewish Toy Merchant (2005) (writer)
 Manslaughter (2005) (writer)
  (2007) (writer)
 A Man Comes Home (2007) (writer)
 Go With Peace, Jamil (2008) (co-writer)
  (2008) (dramaturgist)
  (2008) (writer)

References

External links 
 
 Interview with The Dogme Doctor Mogens Rukov

1943 births
2015 deaths
Bodil Honorary Award recipients
Danish dramatists and playwrights
Danish male screenwriters
People from Holstebro